Regina Valter (born 1995) is a Kazakhstani model and beauty pageant titleholder who was crowned Miss Almaty 2015 and later placed 3rd runner-up to Alia Mergenbaeva at the Miss Kazakhstan 2015 pageant.

Personal life
Regina is currently student of Tyumen State University of Architecture and Civil Engineering in Russia.

Pageantry

Miss Almaty 2015
Regina crowned Miss Almaty 2015 on August 22, 2015. She was set to represent her country at the Miss Universe 2016 but was disqualified after getting married and was replaced by Darina Kulsitova who previously competed at the Miss Kazakhstan 2014 national pageant. The announcement was made a day before the contestants would officially start arriving in the Philippines.

Miss Kazakhstan 2015
She then competed at the Miss Kazakhstan 2015 pageant and finished 3rd runner-up to Alia Mergenbaeva.

References

External links
Official Miss Kazakhstan website

1995 births
Living people
Kazakhstani beauty pageant winners
Kazakhstani people of Russian descent
People from Almaty
Miss Kazakhstan winners
Kazakhstani female models